The Christ the King Cathedral, also called Nha Trang Cathedral, is the mother church of the Catholic Diocese of Nha Trang in central Vietnam.

The parish was founded in 1886 by French missionaries. The present church was built in Gothic Revival style in 1928 as a parish, depending on the Apostolic Vicariate of Quinhon. It was consecrated on Easter 1930 under the title of "Christ the King". Then she was attended by a famous French priest in the Foreign Missions of Paris, Louis Vallet (1869-1945), who is buried next and devoted his life to his parishioners.

When the apostolic vicariate was erected in 1957 and the diocese created in 1960, with Monsignor Paquet, from the Foreign Missions, as first bishop, the church was chosen as the cathedral.

The cathedral, very well located in the upper part of this coastal city, has a remarkable amount of stained glass windows depicting saints, including several French saints, as St. Joan of Arc, and St. John Vianney, and also episodes from the life of Jesus.

See also
Roman Catholicism in Vietnam
Christ the King Cathedral (disambiguation)

References

Roman Catholic cathedrals in Vietnam
Nha Trang
Roman Catholic churches completed in 1928
20th-century Roman Catholic church buildings in Vietnam